The Deckers Creek Trail is a rail trail located in West Virginia.

The  trail climbs a 2% grade, rising  in elevation as it runs through the deciduous forests, hemlock groves, open fields and farmlands in Preston County.

Together with the Mon River Trail and Caperton Trail, it forms a  network of multi-use, non-motorized use, trails connecting Marion County, Monongalia County and Preston County.

Location
 Western terminus at the intersection with the Deckers Creek Trail in Hazel Ruby McQuain Riverfront Park in Morgantown, West Virginia.
 Eastern terminus at County Route 56 east of Reedsville, West Virginia.

References

External links
 Mon River Trails Conservancy

Rail trails in West Virginia
National Recreation Trails in West Virginia
Transportation in Preston County, West Virginia
Protected areas of Preston County, West Virginia
Transportation in Monongalia County, West Virginia
Protected areas of Monongalia County, West Virginia